Geodorcus novaezealandiae is a large flightless species of stag beetle in the family Lucanidae. It is the type species and smallest member of the genus Geodorcus. It is endemic to New Zealand.

Description

This species is considerably smaller than other members of Geodorcus. Male Helm's stag beetle have been collected that are 44 mm including mandibles, whereas male Geodorcus novaezealandiae, including the mandibles, range in size from 12 to 21.5 mm. Females are generally smaller, ranging in size from 11 to 17.4 mm. Like all other Geodorcus, they show sexual dimorphism: the male beetle has a much wider head and larger mandibles. They have a dull to slightly glossy black exoskeleton with obvious raised ribs on the elytra.

Distribution
This species is found in the south of the North Island. Its range extends from the Akatarawa Valley in the Tararua Range in the north of the region to the Aorangi Range in the south.  It has been observed at altitudes from near sea level to 365 m.

Habitat
Geodorcus novaezealandiae has been observed under the bark of live rimu and southern beech trees. They have also been found in old beech stumps and amongst roots. Like other Geodorcus species, they are forest-dwelling, nocturnal beetles.

Conservation
All Geodorcus species are protected under Schedule 7 of the 1953 Wildlife Act, making it an offense to possess, harm or sell these beetles. Geodorcus novaezealandiae is likely the most abundant of all the Geodorcus. It has a conservation status of Naturally Uncommon (Range Restricted).

References

External links
 
 

Beetles described in 1845
Lucaninae
Beetles of New Zealand
Endemic fauna of New Zealand
Endemic insects of New Zealand